The Communauté de communes Terre de Picardie is a communauté de communes in the Somme département and in the Hauts-de-France région of France. It was formed on 1 January 2017 by the merger of the former Communauté de communes de Haute Picardie and the Communauté de communes du Santerre. It consists of 43 communes, and its seat is in Estrées-Deniécourt. Its area is 295.7 km2, and its population was 18,233 in 2019.

Composition
The communauté de communes consists of the following 43 communes:

Ablaincourt-Pressoir
Assevillers
Bayonvillers
Beaufort-en-Santerre
Belloy-en-Santerre
Berny-en-Santerre
Bouchoir
Caix
Chaulnes
La Chavatte
Chilly
Chuignes
Dompierre-Becquincourt
Estrées-Deniécourt
Fay
Folies
Fontaine-lès-Cappy
Foucaucourt-en-Santerre
Fouquescourt
Framerville-Rainecourt
Fransart
Fresnes-Mazancourt
Guillaucourt
Hallu
Harbonnières
Herleville
Hypercourt
Lihons
Marchélepot-Misery
Maucourt
Méharicourt
Parvillers-le-Quesnoy
Proyart
Punchy
Puzeaux
Rosières-en-Santerre
Rouvroy-en-Santerre
Soyécourt
Vauvillers
Vermandovillers
Vrély
Warvillers
Wiencourt-l'Équipée

References

Terre de Picardie
Terre de Picardie